Adulis Club is an Eritrean football club based in Asmara.

Achievements
Eritrean Premier League: 3
1996, 2004, 2006

Performance in CAF competitions
CAF Champions League: 1 appearance
2005 – Preliminary Round

External links
Team profile – Soccerway.com

Football clubs in Eritrea
Year of establishment missing